Wahlenbergia victoriensis is a herbaceous plant in the family Campanulaceae native to eastern Australia.

It blooms throughout the year producing blue flowers.

The species is found in New South Wales and Victoria.

References

graniticola
Flora of New South Wales
Flora of Victoria (Australia)